Tracey Hannah (born 13 June 1988 in Cairns, Australia) is a Professional Downhill bike rider. She raced her first national BMX title when she was 4 years old. Tracey chose to do MTB when she saw Mick Hannah (her eldest brother of four) was racing down a hill very fast on an MTB camp in 1997.

When she was 13 her parents let her try downhill riding. As soon as she was 14, she raced for the national titles in elite, and she came in 2nd place. For 7 years, she was Australian National Champion. After that, she started racing overseas and her results were; First in the NORBA Series overall, A Junior World Championship, Third in a World Cup overall, Third in Elite World Championships, and she has won a World Cup Round.

In 2012 her best places were 1st and 2nd out of 7 rounds of the World Cup Series, and she finished 4th Overall. However, she missed out on racing the 6th, and 7th rounds. During practice for the 6th round, she crashed and was helicoptered out to the nearest hospital. She had broken her femur, collarbone, bruised a lung, and had a hematoma.

Her first race, after recovering from her injury, was 7 months later in February 2013. This was the Australian National Championships, and she took first place. She was the National Champion for 2013.

Team

Tracey Hannah is currently racing for the NS bikes UR team as a Downhill rider.

Achievement 
 Eleven time Australian National Champion
 2019 
 1st 2019 UCI World Cup Champion (DH)
 1st UCI World Cup Round 5, Les Gets France
 1st UCI World Cup Round 3, Leogang Austria
 1st iXS European Cup #1, Maribor Slovenia
 1st Crankworx Whistler - Canadian Open DH, Whistler B.C. Canada
 1st Crankworx Innsbruck - DH, Innsbruck Austria
 1st Crankworx Rotorua - DH, Rotorua New Zealand
 1st MTBA - Australian National Championship
 2018 
 1st Crankworx Whistler - Canadian Open DH, Whistler B.C. Canada
 1st Crankworx Innsbruck - DH, Innsbruck Austria
 1st MTBA - Australian National Championship
 2017 
 3rd UCI World Championships Elite Women, Cairns Australia
 1st UCI World Cup Round 2, Fort William Scotland
 1st Crankworx Whistler - Canadian Open DH, Whistler B.C. Canada
 1st Crankworx Whistler - Garbonzo DH, Whistler B.C. Canada
 1st Crankworx Innsbruck - DH, Innsbruck Austria
 1st Crankworx Rotorua - iXS DH, Rotorua New Zealand
 2016 
 3rd UCI World Championships Elite Women, Val di Sole Italy
 1st Crankworx Whistler - Canadian Open DH, Whistler B.C. Canada
 1st MTBA - Australian National Championship
 2015 
 3rd UCI World Championships Elite Women, Vallnord Andorra
 1st MTBA - Australian National Championship
 2014 
 4th Overall UCI World Cup Series
 1st Crankworx Whistler - Canadian Open DH, Whistler B.C. Canada
 1st MTBA - Australian National Championship
 2013 
 3rd UCI World Championships Elite Women, Pietermaritzburg South Africa
 1st MTBA - Australian National Championship
 1st City Downhill, Bratislava Slovakia
 2012 
 4th Overall UCI World Cup Series
 1st UCI World Cup Round 1, Pietermaritzburg South Africa
 1st MTBA - Australian National Championship
 2007 
 3rd UCI World Championships Elite Women, Fort William Scotland
 3rd Overall UCI World Cup Series
 1st UCI World Cup Round 4, Schladming Austria
 2006 
 Junior UCI World Champion
 Norba Series Champion

References

External links

 https://web.archive.org/web/20150211173403/http://urteamracing.com/tracey-hannah/

Living people
Australian female cyclists
1988 births
Sportspeople from Cairns
Cyclists from Queensland
Sportswomen from Queensland